Natalie Lennox (born January 12, 1964, in the USA) is an American actress and model. In 1992, she took over the role of "Lace" on the weekly TV reality game show American Gladiators that had previously been played by actress Marisa Pare from 1989 to 1992.

Lennox was the Penthouse Pet of the Month for January 1993, and she has appeared on Star Search and Dallas as well as in Playboy.

References

External links
 
 
American Gladiators Lace Profile (GladiatorsTV.com)

Living people
1967 births
Penthouse Pets